USS Hudson may refer to the following ships of the United States Navy:

, was a frigate purchased by the U.S. Navy in 1828 and sold in 1844
, was a U.S. Revenue Cutter Service vessel loaned to the U.S. Navy during the Spanish–American War
, was a  commissioned 13 April 1943 and sold for scrap in 1973
, was returned to her owner in February 1984

United States Navy ship names